Maurice (Moritz) Loewy (15 April 1833 – 15 October 1907) was a French astronomer.

Loewy was born in Vienna. Loewy's Jewish parents moved to Vienna in 1841 to escape the antisemitism of their home town. Loewy became an assistant at the Vienna Observatory, working on celestial mechanics. However, the institutions of Austria-Hungary did not permit a Jew to advance to a senior position without renouncing his faith and embracing Catholicism. The director of the observatory Karl L. Littrow was a correspondent of Urbain Le Verrier, director of the Paris Observatory and he secured a position there for Loewy in 1860. After going to France, Loewy become a naturalised French citizen.

He worked on the orbits of asteroids and comets and on the measurement of longitude, improving the accuracy of the Connaissance des Temps. He also worked on optics and the elimination of the aberration of light.

He was elected a member of the Bureau des Longitudes in 1872 and of the Académie des Sciences in 1873.

Loewy became director of the Paris Observatory in 1896, reorganising the institution and establishing a department of physical astronomy. He further spent a decade working with Pierre Puiseux on an atlas of the Moon composed of 10,000 photographs, L’Atlas photographique de la Lune (1910), the definitive basis for lunar geography for over half a century.  The crater Loewy on the Moon is named after him and asteroid 253 Mathilde is believed to be named after his wife.

He died in Paris at a government meeting of a sudden and unanticipated cardiac arrest.

Honours
Gold Medal of the Royal Astronomical Society, (1889)

References

External links

 Obituaries of M. Loewy in the Astrophysics Data System
 Atlas photographique de la Lune, on the digital library of Paris Observatory

1833 births
1907 deaths
19th-century French astronomers
19th-century Austrian Jews
Austrian emigrants to France
Members of the French Academy of Sciences
Foreign associates of the National Academy of Sciences
Recipients of the Gold Medal of the Royal Astronomical Society
Scientists from Vienna
Austrian Empire Jews
19th-century Afghan military personnel